The Building at 10 Follen Street is an historic house at 10 Follen Street in Cambridge, Massachusetts.  The three story wood-frame house was designed by Peabody and Stearns and built in 1875.  It is a rare well-preserved example of the transition between Second Empire and Stick styles, with a truncated hip roof, a highly decorated porch, and most of its original interior woodwork.

The house was listed on the National Register of Historic Places in 1982, and was included in the Follen Street Historic District in 1986.

See also
National Register of Historic Places listings in Cambridge, Massachusetts

References

Houses on the National Register of Historic Places in Cambridge, Massachusetts
Historic district contributing properties in Massachusetts
National Register of Historic Places in Middlesex County, Massachusetts
Peabody and Stearns buildings
Houses completed in 1875